Rear Admiral Sigmund R. Petersen (born ? ) is a retired career officer who served in the United States Coast and Geodetic Survey Corps, its successor, the Environmental Science Services Administration Corps (ESSA Corps), and the ESSA Corps's successor, the National Oceanic and Atmospheric Administration Commissioned Officer Corps (NOAA Corps). He served as the fourth Director of the NOAA Corps.

Early life
Petersen was born in Haugesund, Norway, and emigrated to the United States with his parents in 1948. He graduated from Washington State University in 1961 with a Bachelor of Science degree in civil engineering.

Career

In 1961, Petersen joined the United States Coast and Geodetic Survey, accepting a commission as an ensign in the United States Coast and Geodetic Survey Corps. On 13 July 1965, a new United States Government scientific agency, the Environmental Science Services Administration (ESSA), was created. Under the reorganization that created ESSA, both the Coast and Geodetic Survey and the United States Weather Bureau, although retaining their independent identities, came under the control of ESSA, and the Coast and Geodetic Survey Corps was removed from the Coast and Geodetic Survey and subordinated directly to ESSA, becoming the Environmental Science Services Administration Corps (ESSA Corps). As of that date, Petersen became an officer of the new ESSA Corps. On 3 October 1970, ESSA was abolished and replaced by the National Oceanic and Atmospheric Administration (NOAA). Under the reorganization that accompanied the creation of NOAA, the Coast and Geodetic Survey was abolished and its functions were transferred to various parts of the new NOAA organization. The ESSA Corps became the new National Oceanic and Atmospheric Administration Commissioned Officer Corps (NOAA Corps), and Petersen became a NOAA Corps officer.

Early in his career, Petersen was a junior officer aboard the Coast and Geodetic Survey ocean survey ship USC&GS Pathfinder (OSS 30) and with hydrographic survey field parties. He served a tour as a recruiting officer in Kansas City, Missouri, and as executive officer of the survey ship NOAAS McArthur (S 330), as acting chief of a special projects group in hydrography and oceanography, and as a liaison officer and operations control center leader for the 1969 interagency Barbados Oceanographic and Meteorological Experiment (BOMEX). In 1971, he received a master's degree in marine affairs from the University of Rhode Island. In July 1971, as a commander, he became the deputy director of the Lake Survey Center in Detroit, Michigan, serving there until March 1973. In 1974, he was operations officer of the Atlantic Tropical Experiment in Senegal, which deployed an international force of 40 ships across the Atlantic Ocean.

During his career, Petersen served aboard five different ships of the Coast and Geodetic Survey fleet and later the NOAA fleet, and during the 1970s and 1980s he served tours as commanding officer of the research ships NOAAS Miller Freeman (R 223) and NOAAS Discoverer (R 102).

Petersen was Director of the NOAA Office of Marine Operations from January to September 1988. He then became Director of NOAA's Pacific Marine Center, in charge of NOAA's fleet of survey and research ships in the Pacific Ocean, remaining in the position until 1990. Early in his tour at the Pacific Marine Center, he was the operational coordinator of the United States Government's participation in Operation Breakthrough, an international effort in October 1988 to free three gray whales from pack ice in the Beaufort Sea near Point Barrow, Alaska.

On 26 July 1990, President George H. W. Bush nominated Petersen to succeed Rear Admiral Francis D. "Bill" Moran as Director of the NOAA Corps. The United States Senate confirmed Petersen's appointment on 4 October 1990. Petersen was himself promoted to rear admiral and was sworn in as NOAA Corps Director on 23 October 1990. He served as director until 22 May 1995, when he was succeeded by Rear Admiral William L. Stubblefield and retired from NOAA.

Awards
 Department of Commerce Silver Medal

In a ceremony on 21 October 1975 in Washington, D.C., Petersen was among a group of four NOAA personnel who received the Department of Commerce Silver Medal for their work in planning and implementing the Global Atmospheric Research Project's Tropical Atlantic Experiment.

References

Living people
Date of birth missing (living people)
People from Haugesund
Norwegian emigrants to the United States
Washington State University alumni
University of Rhode Island alumni
American civil engineers
United States Coast and Geodetic Survey personnel
Environmental Science Services Administration personnel
National Oceanic and Atmospheric Administration Commissioned Officer Corps admirals
Year of birth missing (living people)